The Mamak people are one of several sub-groups that make up the population of Malaysia. They are of Indian origin, and mostly practice the religion of Islam, as they largely hail from the southern regions of India, especially Tamil Nadu and spoke Tamil, though that is changing with further assimilation into Malaysian culture. The term Maama is used as a common honorific in Malaysian culture. Today there are many Mamak in Penang, where the group has had much greater influence, and acceptance without necceasrily fully assimilating. While it has been noted to be used in a derogatory fashion by some Malay, as it can have connotations of 'second class citizen,' it is largely confiend to referring to Tamil and Indian Muslim community in Malaysia.

History 
Tamil speaking Indian Muslims played in important role in the historic court of Melaka as ministers and advisors. In these positions, they would often marry into the relations of the royal family, and the term Mamak meant "maternal uncle" or "father-in-law" in Tamil and was used as an honorific.

References

Anthropology
Ethnic groups in Malaysia